Eden Hospital, established in 1881, houses the Department of Gynaecology and Obstetrics in Medical College Kolkata, India.

History

The gynaecological & midwifery care at Medical College received a great boost with the establishment of the Eden Hospital in 1881. The admission of patients started from 17 July 1882 with accommodation for 41 Europeans and 42 Indians. This was the largest obstetrics & gynaecological ward in the whole of Asia. The Eden Hospital extension was completed in 1931 to accommodate a further 38 patients. In 1933, the trustees of the Estate of the late Mary Helena Mauger of Darjeeling donated Rs. 3,07,00 for Eden Hospital. Two hostels for junior doctors, namely Bonophool Hostel & Eden Roof Hostels, were built above the 3rd floor of the Eden Hospital in the 1970s.

External links
Medical College Calcutta site on Eden Hospital 

Hospitals in Kolkata
Medical College and Hospital, Kolkata
Hospital buildings completed in 1882
Hospitals established in 1881
1881 establishments in British India